The 1995–96 season was the 93rd season in existence of Cremonese and the club's third consecutive season in the top flight of Italian football. In addition to the domestic league, Cremonese participated in this season's edition of the Coppa Italia. The season covered the period from 1 July 1995 to 30 June 1996.

Players

First-team squad

Pre-season and friendlies

Competitions

Overview

Serie A

League table

Results summary

Results by round

Matches

Source:

Coppa Italia

References

U.S. Cremonese seasons
U.S. Cremonese